Akeem Christopher Ayers (born July 10, 1989) is a former American football linebacker. He played college football at UCLA and was drafted by the Tennessee Titans in the second round of the 2011 NFL Draft. He has also played for the St. Louis Rams, Indianapolis Colts, New York Giants, and won Super Bowl XLIX with the New England Patriots.

High school career
Ayers attended Verbum Dei High School in Los Angeles, where he played for the Verbum Dei Eagles high school football team. He won a CIF championship during his senior season.

College career
Ayers played for UCLA in college. Ayers is known for his athletic interceptions for touchdowns, one in the 2009 season against Oregon and one against Temple in the 2009 EagleBank Bowl. The latter was the game-winning score of the bowl game and helped him earn MVP honors. In a post-game interview, he admitted that he slipped, and was just trying to rush the passer on his game-changing play.  As he got up, he saw the quarterback looking to pass, jumped up, and pulled in the pass for an interception and score.

On September 18, 2010, Ayers had a key interception against #23 Houston in UCLA's first win against a ranked opponent since 2008. The following week on September 25, he played a key role in the Bruins' second upset against a ranked opponent in a victory over No. 7 ranked Texas Longhorns 34–12 in front of more 101,000 fans in Austin, Texas. Ayers had a key interception, seven tackles, a forced fumble, and a sack. He was named Lott IMPACT Player of the Week on September 27. At the end of the 2010 season, his junior year, he entered for the NFL draft.

*Had two interceptions for touchdown and one fumble recovery for touchdown

Professional career

Tennessee Titans
Ayers was selected 39th overall by the Tennessee Titans in the 2011 NFL Draft.

New England Patriots
On October 21, 2014, the Titans traded Ayers along with a seventh round draft pick in the 2015 NFL Draft to the New England Patriots for a sixth round draft choice. In each of his first two games with New England, Ayers recorded a sack.

Ayers won Super Bowl XLIX with the Patriots after they defeated the Seattle Seahawks 28-24.

St. Louis Rams

On March 12, 2015, Ayers signed a two-year contract with the St. Louis Rams. On September 3, 2016, he was released by the Rams as part of final roster cuts.

Indianapolis Colts
Ayers signed a two-year contract with the Indianapolis Colts on September 6, 2016. On September 2, 2017, Ayers was released during final roster cuts.

New York Giants
On November 14, 2017, Ayers signed with the New York Giants.

References

External links
 
 Los Angeles Rams bio
 Tennessee Titans bio
 UCLA Bruins bio

1989 births
Living people
People from Watts, Los Angeles
Players of American football from Los Angeles
American football linebackers
UCLA Bruins football players
Tennessee Titans players
New England Patriots players
St. Louis Rams players
Los Angeles Rams players
Indianapolis Colts players
New York Giants players
Verbum Dei High School alumni